This is a list of National Basketball Association (NBA) franchise post-season appearance droughts. This list includes the all-time and the active consecutive non-playoffs. Aside from the NBA playoff appearance droughts, this list also includes droughts of series wins, appearances in the NBA Finals and NBA championship wins. The oldest such franchise is the Suns (54 seasons), while the Royals/Kings and the Hawks have even longer championship droughts (71 and 64 seasons, respectively). Six franchises have never been to the NBA Finals, the highest number among the major North American sports. The oldest such team is the Braves/Clippers franchise (52 seasons); the Kings and the Hawks have appearance droughts that are even longer (71 and 61 seasons, respectively). The longest a franchise has gone without appearing in the playoffs at all is 16 seasons: the Kings franchise from 2007 to 2022.

Of the 19 franchises that have won an NBA championship, 7 have droughts of 38 seasons or more, which is to say that the past 38 championships have been shared among only 12 franchises: the Lakers (9), Bulls (6), Spurs (5), Warriors (4), Pistons (3), Celtics (3), Heat (3), Rockets (2), Mavericks (1), Cavaliers (1), Raptors (1) and Bucks (1). By contrast, the other three major North American sports have each had at least 17 franchises become champions over the same period of time.

Active droughts

NBA Playoffs appearance droughts
Appearance droughts updated through April 15, 2022.
Playoff picture at NBA.com

NBA Playoffs series win droughts
Droughts updated through June 16, 2022.
Playoff picture at NBA.com

 Charlotte was also inactive for two years following the  season.

NBA Conference Finals appearance droughts

NBA Finals appearance droughts

 The Sacramento Kings last appeared in the 1951 NBA Finals as the Rochester Royals.
 The Atlanta Hawks last appeared in the 1961 NBA Finals as the St. Louis Hawks.
 The Washington Wizards last appeared in the 1979 Conference Finals and NBA Finals as the Washington Bullets.
 The Brooklyn Nets last appeared in the 2003 Conference Finals and NBA Finals as the New Jersey Nets.

NBA championship title droughts

 The Sacramento Kings last won an NBA championship in 1951 as the Rochester Royals.
 The Atlanta Hawks last won an NBA championship in 1958 as the St. Louis Hawks.
 The Washington Wizards last won an NBA championship in 1978 as the Washington Bullets.
 The Oklahoma City Thunder last won an NBA championship in 1979 as the Seattle SuperSonics.

All-time droughts

Closest approaches without winning

Updated through the 2022 playoffs.

Longest post-season droughts in team history

Updated through the 2021–22 season.

Longest post-season series win droughts

Updated through the 2022–23 season.

Longest NBA Playoffs appearance droughts
Appearance droughts updated through the 2021–22 season.

Longest Conference finals droughts
Appearance droughts updated through June 18, 2021. The current Conference Finals format was introduced in 1971.

 Streak includes seasons as Buffalo Braves and San Diego Clippers.
 Team last qualified for the Conference Finals as Washington Bullets.
 Franchise inactive for two seasons between 2002 and 2004.
 Current Brooklyn Nets; includes one season as New York Nets.
 Includes four seasons as Kansas City Kings.

Finals droughts

NBA Finals in which neither team had previously won a championship

In these instances, the matchup ensured that one team would win the first NBA championship in its history.

^- Team had previously appeared in the National Basketball League finals before said league was merged for the NBA's formation.
†- Defunct franchise.
Abbreviation in parentheses – Current location of NBA franchise.

NBA Finals in which neither franchise had won a championship in 20-plus seasons

Teams that had never won the NBA championship are included, even if they were less than 20 seasons old at the time.

Numbers marked with * indicates that the number is counted from either the franchise's first year in the NBA or the first year of the league (1946, then known as the BAA).
†- Defunct franchise.

Teams awaiting their first NBA championship
This list includes teams within the current NBA that have never won an NBA championship—sorted by the number of seasons played in the NBA.

Notes
 § NBA teams that have relocated from their original city(s).
 † NBA teams that have re-branded to/from their original concept.
 ‡ NBA teams that have won an ABA championship.

Cities awaiting first NBA championship
Listed according to seasons waited.
Current NBA cities/regions only.

NBA Championship droughts by division

Notes
 ‡ The last time a team playing in the present-day Northwest Division won an NBA Championship.
 † The SuperSonics won this NBA Championship as part of the Pacific Division. The team has relocated to Oklahoma City as the Oklahoma City Thunder.

NBA Division Championship droughts
Updated through the 2021–22 season.

Left click once on Seasons since win column heading then once on Division column headingto show teams listed in order of division championships.

See also

List of NBA franchise post-season streaks
List of National Basketball Association longest losing streaks
List of National Basketball Association longest winning streaks
List of MLB franchise post-season droughts
List of NFL franchise post-season droughts
List of NHL franchise post-season droughts
List of MLS club post-season droughts

References
General

Specific

National Basketball Association playoffs
NBA post-season droughts
Post-season droughts